William Brockenbrough may refer to:

 William Henry Brockenbrough (1812–1850), U.S. Representative from Florida
 William Brockenbrough (judge) (1778–1838), Virginia lawyer, political figure and judge